Conus solangeae is a species of sea snail, a marine gastropod mollusk in the family Conidae, the cone snails and their allies.

Like all species within the genus Conus, these snails are predatory and venomous. They are capable of "stinging" humans, therefore live ones should be handled carefully or not at all.

Description
The size of the shell varies between 20 mm and 28 mm.

Distribution
This marine species occurs off Madagascar.

References

 Bozzetti L. (2004) Conus solangeae (Gastropoda: Prosobranchia, Conidae) dal Madagascar Meridionale. Malacologia Mostra Mondiale 43: 13–14
 Puillandre N., Duda T.F., Meyer C., Olivera B.M. & Bouchet P. (2015). One, four or 100 genera? A new classification of the cone snails. Journal of Molluscan Studies. 81: 1–23

External links
 The Conus Biodiversity website
 Cone Shells – Knights of the Sea
 

solangeae
Gastropods described in 2004